Jo Eom (1719 – 1777) was a Korean civil minister (munsin) in the 18th century during the late period of the Korean Joseon Dynasty (1392–1897).

He was also diplomat and ambassador, representing Joseon interests in the 11th Edo period diplomatic mission to the Tokugawa shogunate in Japan. He is credited with introducing the cultivation of potatoes as a food staple in Korea in the mid-18th century.

Biography
Jo Eom was of the Pungyang Jo clan, and his father was Jo Sang-gyeong with the title of Ijo panseo (a Minister of Personnel, 이조판서, 吏曹判書).

In 1738, he passed saengwonsi, the state examination, with a low grade. In 1752, he passed high grade examination (Jeongsi) and served for the government as the Jeongeon (정언, 正言), and became Gyori (교리, 校理), administrator of Dongnae and Amhaengeosa (Secret governmental inspectors) of Chungcheong province, in the 1757. In 1760, he suggested to established three Jochang (조창, 漕倉, storehouse) in southern Gyeongsang province, which was contributed development of economic in this region. He also became Daesaheon (대사헌, 大司憲), Bujehak (부제학, 副提學) and Yejo chamui (예조참의, 禮曹參議).

King Yeongjo sent a diplomatic mission to Japan (Joseon Tongsinsa) in 1764. This embassy to court of Tokugawa Ieharu was led by Jo Eom. This diplomatic mission functioned to the advantage of both the Japanese and the Koreans as a channel for developing a political foundation for trade. He brought in foreign crop, a sweet potato, and grew in Dongnae and Jeju Island.

He was appointed Uigeumbu jisa (의금부지사, 義禁府知事), Ijo panseo and Jehak (제학, 提學). Soon after that, he became Pyongando Gwanchalsa, the governor of Pyongan province. However, he took away all power by accusation.

After his return to court, Jo Eom was appointed Daesagan (대사간, 大司諫) and Ijo panseo. In 1777, he was entrapped and banished to Wiwon, northern Pyongan region, by Hong Guk-yeong's faction. Later, he was transferred to Gimhae, southern Gyeongsang region, and died there.

Jo's writings are preserved in the  Haesa ilgi (Diary of Overseas Mission, 해사일기, 海槎日記) and Haehaeng chongjae (해행총재, 海行摠載).

Family
Father: Jo Sang-gyeong (조상경)
Grandfather: Jo Do-bo (조도보)
Grandmother: Lady, of the Gyeongju Gim clan (정경부인 경주 김씨)
Mother: Lady, of the Bupyeong Yi clan (정경부인 부평 이씨)
Grandfather: Yi Jeong-tae (이정태)
Older brother: Jo-Don (조돈, 趙暾)
Wife: Lady, of the Pungsan Hong clan (정경부인 풍산 홍씨)
Son: Jo Jin-gwan (조진관)
Son: Jo Jin-ui (조진의)
Daughter: Lady Jo (조씨)
Daughter: Lady Jo (조씨)

See also
 List of Joseon Dynasty people
 Joseon Tongsinsa

Notes

References

 Daehwan, Noh.  "The Eclectic Development of Neo-Confucianism and Statecraft from the 18th to the 19th Century," Korea Journal (Winter 2003).
 Lewis, James Bryant. (2003). Frontier contact between chosŏn Korea and Tokugawa Japan. London: Routledge. 
 Ŏm Cho; Yŏn-tʻak Chŏng and Hun Yu. (1982). Cho Ŏm ŭi Ilbon kihaeng (조엄의 일본 기행). Seoul: Minjok Munhwa Chʻujinhoe. OCLC
 Titsingh, Isaac, ed. (1834). [Siyun-sai Rin-siyo/Hayashi Gahō, 1652], Nipon o daï itsi ran; ou,  Annales des empereurs du Japon.  Paris: Oriental Translation Fund of Great Britain and Ireland.  OCLC  84067437
 Walker, Brett L.  "Foreign Affairs and Frontiers in Early Modern Japan: A Historiographical Essay," Early Modern Japan. Fall, 2002, pp. 44–62, 124-128.
 Walraven, Boudewijn and Remco E. Breuker. (2007). Korea in the middle: Korean studies and area studies; Essays in Honour of Boudewijn Walraven.	Leiden: CNWS Publications. ; 
 Wiwŏnhoe, Yunesŭkʻo Hanʼguk. (2004). Korean History: Discovery of Its Characteristics and Developments. Elizabeth, New Jersey: Hollym.  ;

External links
 Joseon Tongsinsa Cultural Exchange Association ; 
 조선통신사연구 (Journal of Studies in Joseon Tongsinsa) 

1719 births
1777 deaths
Joseon dynasty
Korean diplomats
18th-century Korean people
Pungyang Jo clan